Theoklitos Karipidis (born ) is a Greek male former volleyball player. He was part of the Greece men's national volleyball team. He competed at the 2009 Men's European Volleyball Championship.

References

External links
 profile, club career, info at greekvolley.gr (in Greek)

1980 births
Living people
Greek men's volleyball players
Iraklis V.C. players
Olympiacos S.C. players
Panathinaikos V.C. players
Place of birth missing (living people)